The 2005–06 DFB-Pokal was the 63rd season of the annual German football cup competition. Sixty-four teams competed in the tournament of six rounds which began on 19 August 2005 and ended on 29 April 2006. In the final, Bayern Munich defeated Eintracht Frankfurt 1–0, thereby claiming their 13th title and also winning the double. It was the first time in German football that a team won the double two seasons in a row.

Matches

First round

Second round

Round of 16

Quarter-finals

Semi-finals

Final

References

External links
Official site of the DFB 
Kicker.de 

2005-06
2005–06 in German football cups